Ectoedemia vannifera is a moth of the family Nepticulidae. It was described by Edward Meyrick in 1914. It is known from South Africa (it was described from Pretoria).

The larvae feed on Boscia oleoides.

References

Endemic moths of South Africa
Nepticulidae
Moths of Africa
Moths described in 1914